St. Louis–San Francisco Railway 1522 is a two-cylinder, simple class T-54 4-8-2 "Mountain" type steam locomotive built in 1926 by the Baldwin Locomotive Works for the St. Louis–San Francisco Railway (SLSF), also known as the "Frisco". It was retired by the Frisco in 1951 and in May 1959 donated to the National Museum of Transportation in St. Louis, Missouri, where it is currently on display. It was restored to operating condition in the spring of 1988 and operated in excursion service until the fall of 2002 when it was placed back into retirement at the museum.

The 1522 was built to handle Frisco's heavier passenger trains through the hilly Ozark regions.  Five other examples of Frisco Mountain-type locomotives are preserved today throughout the United States.

History

Revenue Service (1926-1951) 
St. Louis–San Francisco 1522 was built in 1926 as part of the third order of 1500-class (aka T-54) "Mountain" type locomotives for the St. Louis-San Francisco Railway. Purchased for $70,000, the locomotive was built to handle heavy passenger and freight services along the Frisco Railway's Eastern and Western Divisions, and had a 200 PSI boiler pressure, 69-inch drivers, 54,085 lbs. of tractive effort, and a top speed of 70 mph.

Throughout its career, the 1522, along with the other T-54s, was found to be well liked by engine crews, dispatchers, and the motive power department. As they were true general-purpose locomotives, they were well suited for use in hotshot freight service, fast passenger service, or even local runs (Four other T-54s - 1500, 1502, 1510, and 1521 - were leased to the Texas and New Orleans Railroad during the late 1940s, who greatly admired the locomotives).

After experimenting with diesel locomotives for the next decade after the start of World War II (during which 1522 and 15 other T-54s were upgraded with booster engines, 210-psi boilers, and 69 1/2-inch drivers, increasing their tractive force to 56,380 (65,550 lbs. with the booster) and their top speed to 90 mph), the Frisco Railway begin to rapidly dieselize during the late 1940s and early 1950s. Ultimately, all scheduled steam operations ended on the Frisco in February 1952 and reserve steam operations ended in 1956.

First retirement (1951–1985) 
The 1522 was originally retired about 1951. In May 1959, The locomotive was selected for preservation and donated to the Museum of Transportation of St. Louis, Missouri.

First restoration and excursion career (1985-2002) 
The 1522 sat on display until September 1985 when the newly formed non-profit organization, The St. Louis Steam Train Association, selected the locomotive for restoration to operational condition. Work was quickly completed and by April 1988, the 1522 entered its second career, yet was returned to retirement in late 2002. This locomotive has done a variety of excursions throughout its excursion career and has been through an overhaul.

In October 1988, 1522 made its inaugural run to Decatur, Illinois. Then in May 1989, the locomotive made its inaugural run to Moberly, Missouri.

In June 1990, 1522 pulled a 22-car excursion over Rolla Hill during the 1990 NRHS annual convention alongside St. Louis Southwestern 819, Norfolk and Western 1218, and Union Pacific 844, and it ran a double-header excursion with Union Pacific 844 once the convention was completed.

I’m June 1994, 1522 was one of the locomotives to participate in the 1994 NRHS annual convention in Atlanta, Georgia, and did a double-header with Norfolk and Western 611 from Birmingham, Alabama to Atlanta on its way to the convention. In June of the following year, the locomotive was the special guest of the annual haymarket heyday and did several excursions between Omaha and Lincoln, Nebraska.

While on a test run following an 18-month overhaul, 1522 derailed on a wye in North St. Louis, Missouri on May 17, 1999. As the locomotive was moving onto the wye, a rail overturned under the fireman's side, causing extensive damage to the running gear. With help from the Tennessee Valley Railroad Museum, the damage was repaired and the locomotive returned to service a few months later.

In June 2001, 1522 was invited to pull the Burlington Northern Santa Fe annual employee appreciation special which included a historic tour through the state of Texas. The 1522 was also invited to pull several excursions for the 2001 NRHS annual convention held that year in St. Louis.

Second retirement (2002-present) 
In 2002, it was announced that the 1522 was to be put back into retirement as a result of increased insurance rates and flue failures. New FRA regulations required that an active steam locomotive must be inspected and re-tubed every 15 years. (old boiler flues must be replaced with new ones), which proved to be too expensive for the SLSTA. Between September 28 and 29 of that year, 1522 ran farewell excursions, and right afterwards it was put back into retirement.

Although it is possible for No. 1522 to run again, the museum has stated that a return to service isn't possible, largely due to the locomotive's flue sheet being damaged beyond repair (a new one would have to be fabricated, and new flues would be needed before another steam-up). As of 2023, Frisco 1522 is still a major exhibit at the National Museum of Transportation, and it remains the only 4-8-2 type in the United States to have an excursion career.

References

Further reading

External links 

 Database of the Frisco 4-8-2 mountain locomotives
 Diagrams of the 1500 class locomotives
 A Born Again Frisco Survivor-No. 1522 Makes Remarkable Run on Initial Trip.

1522
4-8-2 locomotives
Baldwin locomotives
Individual locomotives of the United States
Standard gauge locomotives of the United States
Preserved steam locomotives of Missouri